The following list includes notable people who were born or have lived in Sherman, Texas.

Academics 

 Light Townsend Cummins, educator and historian
 John C. Hitt, President of the University of Central Florida in Orlando, Florida
 Jerry B. Lincecum, Emeritus Professor of English at Austin College in Sherman, Texas

Media 

 Will Cain, Fox News personality
 Michael Quinn Sullivan, journalist and conservative political activist, based in Austin, Texas

Acting 

 Stella Adams (1883–1961), actress of the silent and early sound film eras
 Bess Flowers, actress
 Candace Kita, actress and model
 Tom Virtue, actor

Music 

 Zach Blair, musician (Hagfish; Rise Against)
 Teddy Buckner, musician
 Sam Coomes, musician
 Arizona Dranes, pioneering gospel singer and pianist
 Jimmy Hotz, record producer, recording engineer, electronic music pioneer, inventor, audio expert, author and musician
 Buck Owens, country and western singer
 Katherine Neal Simmons, singer
 Buddy Tate, jazz saxophone and clarinet player (Count Basie, Benny Goodman, Lionel Hampton)

Military 
 John A. Hilger, United States Air Force brigadier general and participant of the Doolittle Raid during World War II

Politics 

 Joseph W. Bailey, former U.S. senator and attorney in Dallas, died in a courtroom in Sherman in 1929
 William Jefferson Blythe, Jr., father of former U.S. President Bill Clinton
 Ronald H. Clark, former Republican member of the Texas House of Representatives from District 62 in Sherman; judge of the United States District Court for the Eastern District of Texas, based in Beaumont
 Donnie Copeland, Pentecostal pastor, formerly at Greater Life Church in Sherman; Republican member of the Arkansas House of Representatives from North Little Rock, Arkansas
 Rick Hardcastle, rancher and businessman; Republican former member of the Texas House of Representatives from Wilbarger County; born in Sherman in 1956
 Larry Phillips, Sherman judge and former Republican member of the Texas House of Representatives

Government 

 Edna Gladney, early campaigner for children's rights and better living conditions for disadvantaged children
 Charles B. Winstead, FBI agent who killed John Dillinger

Attorney 

 William J. Durham, attorney and leader in the civil rights movement

Sports 

 A.J. Abrams, former professional and Texas Longhorns men's basketball player
 Kyle Crick, professional baseball player, Pittsburgh Pirates
 Chris Gittens, MLB Player, New York Yankee’s 
 Lee Grissom, MLB All-Star pitcher
 Vernon Holland, NFL player, Cincinnati Bengals
 Tex Rickard, boxing promoter, first owner of NHL's New York Rangers, builder of Madison Square Garden, grew up in Sherman
 Chris Rockins, NFL player, Cleveland Browns
 Hunter Smith, NFL player, Indianapolis Colts Super Bowl XLI champion Pro Bowler
 Pete Spratt, MMA Fighter 
 Jimmy Turner, NFL player
 Joe Watson, NFL player
 Ray Wehba, NFL player

Historical 

 Frank James, outlaw, Confederate guerrilla and brother of Jesse James
 Olive Oatman, Yavapai Indian captive and lecturer

Business 

 Kay Kimbell, entrepreneur, philanthropist, benefactor of the Kimbell Art Museum

References

Sherman, Texas
Sherman